Acinia biflexa is a species of tephritid or fruit flies in the genus Acinia of the family Tephritidae.

Distribution
Belgium & West Russia to Albania & Kazakhstan.

References

Tephritinae
Insects described in 1844
Diptera of Europe